Eshbal (lit. Stachys) is a kibbutz in northern Israel, located in the Lower Galilee near Karmiel.

History
Eshbal was founded in 1979 as a Nahal settlement. It was civilianised in January 1998 by a kvutza of 30 HaNoar HaOved VeHaLomed youth group members. It falls under the jurisdiction of Misgav Regional Council.

Since 1998, Eshbal has been home to the Galil Jewish–Arab School. The kibbutz offers a variety of educational programs including a live-in boarding school and a high school in Karmiel. Most of the boarding school children are from the Ethiopian immigrant community, which is plagued by social problems due to the difficult absorption process. The kibbutz also runs outreach programs in local Arab and Bedouin villages and organizes Jewish-Arab dialogue events.

References

External links
Kibbutz website

Kibbutzim
Nahal settlements
Agricultural Union
Populated places established in 1979
Populated places in Northern District (Israel)
1979 establishments in Israel